is the name for medium fatty tuna when served in sushi restaurants.

Chūtoro is usually found near the skin on the back and belly. It combines the lighter but deep, slightly bitter flavor of an akami with the sweet tenderness of an ōtoro. It is quite expensive and usually served only on special occasions.

References

Tuna